Radovan Ivšić (June 22, 1921 – December 25, 2009) was a Croatian writer, best known for his drama Kralj Gordogan and book of poems Crno. Ivšić spent his life uncompromisingly in the spirit of liberty. Such values brought him close to the surrealist movement. He was a friend of André Breton and Toyen and was one of the signers of the last Manifeste du surréalisme, 1955. His best-known statements are “Never give up your dreams” and paraphrase “We are our dreams”.

Biography
He was a son of Stjepan Ivšić, a Croatian linguist, Slavist, accentologist, and Rector of University of Zagreb (1940–43). After Classical High School and graduation from the University of Zagreb, Faculty of Humanities and Social Sciences, in 1954 he relocated to Paris, where he remained for the rest of his life.

Controversy
The fascist prime minister of Croatia during World War II, Ante Pavelić, personally ordered confiscation of Ivšić's first book, Narcis. His theatrical play Kralj Gordogan was banned in Croatia by both the fascist and communist dictatorships until 1979. Ivšić criticized cheap politics, communism, and false surrealism. He was a critic of Miroslav Krleža, often regarded as the greatest Croatian writer of the 20th century. Ivšić rejected all awards and medals.

Selected works
 Daha (drama), 1941
 Narcis (poem), 1942
 Kralj Gordogan (drama), 1943
 Kapetan Oliver (drama), 1944
 Vodnik pobjednik (drama), 1944
 Snjeguljica (drama), 1948
 Tanke (collection of poems), 1954
 Akvarij (drama), 1954
 Mavena (collection of poems), 1960
 Mavena (collection of poems), 1972
 Autour ou dedans (collection of poems), 1974
 Crno (collection of poems), 1974
 Bunar u kuli (collection of poems), 1974
 Aixaia ili Moći reći (drama), 1983
 Sunčani grad (drama)

References

1921 births
2009 deaths
Croatian dramatists and playwrights
Surrealist dramatists and playwrights
Croatian surrealist writers
Croatian male poets
20th-century Croatian poets
20th-century dramatists and playwrights
20th-century male writers